Woodhead railway station was a railway station that served the hamlet of Woodhead on the Woodhead Line.

History

The station was opened on 8 April 1844 by the Sheffield, Ashton-under-Lyne and Manchester Railway. It was served by stopping passenger trains operating on the route from Manchester London Road to Sheffield Victoria.

The station was later operated by the Great Central Railway and the London and North Eastern Railway.

Second station
A new station was opened in 1953 by the Eastern Region of British Railways on a different site in conjunction with the opening of the new Woodhead Tunnel and electrification of the line. The station was closed on 27 July 1964 but the line remained open for passengers trains until 1970 and to freight traffic until 1981.

Gallery

References

Disused railway stations in Derbyshire
Former Great Central Railway stations
Railway stations in Great Britain opened in 1844
Railway stations in Great Britain closed in 1964